Shebalinsky District (Şabalin aymak) is an administrative and municipal district (raion), one of the ten in the Altai Republic, Russia. It is located in the northwest of the republic. Its administrative center is the rural locality (a selo) of Shebalino. As of the 2010 Census, the total population of the district was 13,596, with the population of Shebalino accounting for 36.2% of that number.

Administrative and municipal status
Within the framework of administrative divisions, Shebalinsky District is one of the ten in the Altai Republic. As a municipal division, the district is incorporated as Shebalinsky Municipal District. Both administrative and municipal districts are divided into the same thirteen rural settlements, comprising twenty-four rural localities. The selo of Shebalino serves as the administrative center of both the administrative and municipal district.

Economy
Agricultural lands comprise 38.4% of the district's territory. Quarrying of marble is conducted in the district; some of the marble used during the building of the Moscow Metro came from here.

See also

References

Notes

Sources
 
 

Districts of the Altai Republic